The genus Polytelis (literally translates into 'magnificent') of the family Psittaculidae consists of three species long-tailed parrot endemic to Australia. Traditionally, it was included in the Australian broad-tailed parrots (tribe Platycercini), but molecular studies place the genus within the Polytelini.

A 2017 molecular study placed the regent parrot as an early offshoot to the genus Asprosmictus and not as closely related to the other two species.

Taxonomy
The genus has three species.

Polytelis Wagler 1832

 Superb parrot or parakeet Polytelis swainsonii (Desmarest) 1826
 Regent parrot or parakeet Polytelis anthopeplus (Lear) 1831
 Polytelis anthopeplus anthopeplus (Lear) 1831
Polytelis anthopeplus monarchoides Schodde 1993
 Princess parrot or Princess Of Wales (POW) parakeet Polytelis alexandrae Gould 1863

References

 
Psittaculini
Bird genera